Clayton is a borough in Gloucester County in the U.S. state of New Jersey. As of the 2020 United States census, the borough's population was 8,807, an increase of 628 (+7.7%) from the 2010 census count of 8,179, which in turn reflected an increase of 1,040 (+14.6%) from the 7,139 counted in the 2000 census.

Jacob Fisler purchased much of the area that is now Clayton, acquiring  of land after the American Revolutionary War. A settlement named Fislertown developed and grew to 36 families by 1812. A glass factory was established in Clayton in the 1850s by one of Fisler's descendants, which contributed to Fislertown's growth.

What is now Clayton was formed as Clayton Township on February 5, 1858, from portions of Franklin Township. Portions of the township were later taken on March 11, 1878, to form Glassboro Township. Clayton was formed as a borough by the New Jersey Legislature on May 9, 1887, from portions of Clayton Township. The remainder of Clayton Township was absorbed by the Clayton on April 14, 1908, and the township was dissolved. Clayton is part of the South Jersey region of the state.

Geography
According to the U.S. Census Bureau, the borough had a total area of 7.26 square miles (18.80 km2), including 7.08 square miles (18.32 km2) of land and 0.18 square miles (0.48 km2) of water (2.53%). Unincorporated communities, localities and place names located partially or completely within the borough include Silver Lake. Clayton borders Elk Township, Franklin Township, Glassboro, and Monroe Township.

Demographics

2020 census
As of the 2020 U.S. census, the population of Clayton was 8,807.

2010 census

The Census Bureau's 2006–2010 American Community Survey showed that (in 2010 inflation-adjusted dollars) median household income was $70,299 (with a margin of error of +/− $5,649) and the median family income was $70,989 (+/− $5,101). Males had a median income of $52,048 (+/− $6,973) versus $39,524 (+/− $6,308) for females. The per capita income for the borough was $27,437 (+/− $2,649). About 9.6% of families and 11.7% of the population were below the poverty line, including 16.9% of those under age 18 and 8.0% of those age 65 or over.

2000 census
As of the 2000 U.S. census there were 7,139 people, 2,464 households, and 1,884 families residing in the borough. The population density was 994.2 people per square mile (383.9/km2). There were 2,680 housing units at an average density of 373.2 per square mile (144.1/km2). The racial makeup of the borough was 79.23% White, 16.05% African American, 0.42% Native American, 0.66% Asian, 0.03% Pacific Islander, 0.95% from other races, and 2.66% from two or more races. Hispanic or Latino of any race were 3.28% of the population.

There were 2,464 households, out of which 39.4% had children under the age of 18 living with them, 57.5% were married couples living together, 13.9% had a female householder with no husband present, and 23.5% were non-families. 19.7% of all households were made up of individuals, and 7.5% had someone living alone who was 65 years of age or older. The average household size was 2.89 and the average family size was 3.31.

In the borough the population was spread out, with 29.1% under the age of 18, 8.7% from 18 to 24, 31.6% from 25 to 44, 21.0% from 45 to 64, and 9.6% who were 65 years of age or older. The median age was 34 years. For every 100 females, there were 91.7 males. For every 100 females age 18 and over, there were 89.8 males.

The median income for a household in the borough was $53,219, and the median income for a family was $63,097. Males had a median income of $37,231 versus $29,063 for females. The per capita income for the borough was $20,006. About 3.1% of families and 2.9% of the population were below the poverty line, including 4.0% of those under age 18 and 1.7% of those age 65 or over.

Parks and recreation
Parkland covers about a third of the borough and includes both municipal and state parks. The Glassboro Wildlife Management Area covers almost  in portions of Clayton, Glassboro, and Monroe Township.

Government

Local government
Clayton is governed under the Borough form of New Jersey municipal government, which is used in 218 of New Jersey's 564 municipalities, making it the state's most common form of government. The governing body is comprised of a mayor and a Borough Council with all positions elected at-large on a partisan basis as part of the November general election. The mayor is elected by the voters to a four-year term of office. The Borough Council includes six members elected to serve three-year terms on a staggered basis with two seats coming up for election each year in a three-year cycle. The Borough form of government used by Clayton is a weak mayor/strong council government in which council members act as the legislative body with the mayor presiding at meetings and voting only in the event of a tie. The mayor can veto ordinances subject to an override by a two-thirds majority vote of the council. The mayor makes committee and liaison assignments for council members, and most appointments are made by the mayor with the advice and consent of the council.

In March 2019, the Borough Council selected Christina Moorhouse from three candidates nominated by the Democratic municipal committee to fill the seat vacated by Vonzora Jackson's resignation.

, the mayor is Democrat Thomas Bianco, whose term of office ends on December 31, 2023. Members of the Borough Council are Council President Tony Saban (D, 2022), Dave Chapes (2024), Christina Moorhouse (D, 2022), Frank Rollo (D, 2024), Charles Simon (D, 2023), and Darlene Vondran (D, 2023).

Clayton describes itself in its motto as "a great place to live and play, work and pray." The seal, which has been used since the late 1960s, features an image of a factory, a house, a figure fishing off a boat, and with a church with a cross, which was challenged by the Freedom From Religion Foundation in March 2016 as "unmistakably religious" and unconstitutional.

Federal, state, and county representation
Clayton is located in the 2nd Congressional District and is part of New Jersey's 3rd state legislative district.

Politics
As of March 2011, there were a total of 4,874 registered voters in Clayton. Of these, 1,755 (36.0%) were registered as Democrats, 819 (16.8%) were registered as Republicans, and 2,296 (47.1%) were registered as Unaffiliated. There were four voters registered as Libertarians or Greens.

In the 2012 presidential election, Democrat Barack Obama received 64.2% of the vote (2,247 cast), ahead of Republican Mitt Romney with 34.5% (1,206 votes), and other candidates with 1.3% (45 votes), among the 3,521 ballots cast by the borough's 5,164 registered voters (23 ballots were spoiled), for a turnout of 68.2%. In the 2008 presidential election, Democrat Barack Obama received 62.1% of the vote (2,270 cast), ahead of Republican John McCain with 35.8% (1,309 votes) and other candidates with 1.3% (49 votes), among the 3,653 ballots cast by the borough's 5,090 registered voters, for a turnout of 71.8%. In the 2004 presidential election, Democrat John Kerry received 54.5% of the vote (1,745 ballots cast), outpolling Republican George W. Bush with 44.6% (1,427 votes) and other candidates with 0.4% (16 votes), among the 3,201 ballots cast by the borough's 4,410 registered voters, for a turnout percentage of 72.6.

In the 2013 gubernatorial election, Republican Chris Christie received 56.7% of the vote (1,133 cast), ahead of Democrat Barbara Buono with 41.9% (837 votes), and other candidates with 1.5% (30 votes), among the 2,039 ballots cast by the borough's 5,133 registered voters (39 ballots were spoiled), for a turnout of 39.7%. In the 2009 gubernatorial election, Democrat Jon Corzine received 48.2% of the vote (1,055 ballots cast), ahead of Republican Chris Christie with 39.8% (871 votes), Independent Chris Daggett with 9.1% (200 votes) and other candidates with 0.8% (17 votes) among the 2,191 ballots cast by the borough's 4,947 registered voters, yielding a 44.3% turnout.

Education
Clayton Public Schools serve public school students in pre-kindergarten through twelfth grade. As of the 2020–21 school year, the district has three schools, an enrollment of 1,463 students, and 117.0 classroom teachers(on an FTE basis for a student–teacher ratio of 12.5:1. Schools in the district (with 2020–21 enrollment data from the National Center for Education Statistics) are Herma S. Simmons Elementary School with 668 students in grades PreK-5, Clayton Middle School with 343 students in grades 6-8, and Clayton High School with 420 students in grades 9-12.

In September 2009, voters approved a referendum that covered a $20 million renovation and expansion project at the middle school / high school. In September 2014, voters approved a referendum that covered $9.7 million to upgrade all three schools in the district. The approved projects include a roof replacement at both the high school and middle school, an addition of a 750-seat auditorium, technology infrastructure at all three schools, a new football field stadium lighting and a new gym floor at Herma Simmons Elementary School.

Students in Gloucester County are eligible to apply to attend Gloucester County Institute of Technology, a four-year high school in Deptford Township that provides technical and vocational education programs. As a public school, students and their families do not pay tuition to attend the school.

Formed from a merger of two regional schools, St. Michael the Archangel Regional School is a K–8 school that operates under the supervision of the Roman Catholic Diocese of Camden. The former St. Catherine of Siena Regional School in Clayton merged with St. Michael in 2008.

Transportation

Roads and highways

The main thoroughfare that passes through is Route 47. Route 55 traverses the borough's southwestern edge, but the closest interchanges are in neighboring communities. A sliver of County Road 553 clips the borough's western edge.

Public transportation
NJ Transit bus service is available between the borough and Philadelphia on its 313 and 408 routes.

Notable people

People who were born in, residents of, or otherwise closely associated with Clayton include:
 Daniel Dalton (born 1949), politician who served as New Jersey Senate Majority Leader and as Secretary of State of New Jersey
 Sunny Gale (1927–2022), pop singer who had her biggest hit with a cover version of "Wheel of Fortune" in 1952
 Granger Hall (born 1962), former professional basketball player
 Earl C. Long (1883–1983), U.S. Marine Corps Major General during World War II who commanded Service Command, Fleet Marine Force Pacific
 Nick Rodriguez (born 1996), submission grappler who competes in no-gi matches
 Mel Sheppard (1883–1942), middle-distance runner who won four gold medals at the 1908 Summer Olympics and 1912 Summer Olympics

References

External links

 Borough of Clayton website

 
1887 establishments in New Jersey
Borough form of New Jersey government
Boroughs in Gloucester County, New Jersey
Populated places established in 1887